Leo Deluglio (born 27 May 1990) is an Argentine actor and singer. He is known for his recurring role as Diego Padilla in the Telemundo telenovela La Doña, and for his role as Iker of the Nickelodeon series Vikki RPM.

Filmography

Awards and nominations

References

External links 
 

1990 births
Living people
Argentine emigrants to Mexico
Male actors from Buenos Aires
21st-century Argentine male singers
Argentine male telenovela actors
Argentine male television actors